Munster Senior League may refer to:

 Munster Senior League (rugby union)   
 Munster Senior League (association football)  
Munster Senior Hurling League